Pioneer News Group was an American media company.

Overview
It was founded in 1974 and it is headquartered in Seattle, Washington. It was owned by the Scripps family, who also started the E. W. Scripps Company. Its printing facilities are in Idaho, Montana, Utah, Oregon, and Washington.  In October, 2017 Pioneer announced that it was selling its newspaper business to the Adams Publishing Group.

Publications
Anacortes American in Anacortes, Washington
The Argus in Mount Vernon, Washington
Belgrade News in Belgrade, Montana
Bozeman Daily Chronicle in Bozeman, Montana
Courier-Times in Mount Vernon, Washington
The Daily Record in Ellensburg, Washington
Fidalgo This Week in Anacortes, Washington
Herald and News in Klamath Falls, Oregon
The Herald Journal in Logan, Utah
The Idaho Press-Tribune in Nampa, Idaho
Idaho State Journal in Pocatello, Idaho
Lake County Examiner in Lakeview, Oregon
The Leader in Tremonton, Utah
Meridian Press in Meridian, Idaho
Messenger Index in Emmett, Idaho
News Examiner in Montpelier, Idaho
The Nickel in Klamath Falls, Oregon
Preston Citizen in Preston, Idaho
Skagit Valley Herald in Mount Vernon, Washington
Standard Journal in Rexburg, Idaho
Stanwood-Camano News in Stanwood, Washington
Teton Valley News in Driggs, Idaho
Kuna Melba News in Kuna, Idaho

References

External links

1974 establishments in Washington (state)
Companies based in Seattle
Newspaper companies of the United States
Publishing companies established in 1974